Nguyễn Địch Dũng (15 July 1925 in Từ Sơn - 26 October 1993) was a Vietnamese journalist and writer. He is noted in the West for his short story collections.

References

Vietnamese writers
1925 births
1993 deaths